Acromantis australis, common name island mantis, is a species of praying mantis found in Australia, the Aru Islands, New Guinea, and Roon.

See also
List of mantis genera and species

References

Australis
Mantodea of Oceania
Mantodea of Southeast Asia
Insects of Australia
Insects of Indonesia
Insects of New Guinea
Insects of Papua New Guinea
Insects of Western New Guinea
Fauna of the Lesser Sunda Islands
Fauna of the Aru Islands
Insects described in 1871